Guntersville High School is a public high school in Guntersville, Alabama. There are more than 500 students on roll.

History
Guntersville High School has existed since the 19th century. Originally, the school was intended to serve only white students. However, the school admitted its first African American student in the 1960s, following the Civil Rights movement.

The current building was constructed in 1971. The board wants to build a new campus, but town residents voted down a tax increase that would have accomplished this in 2021.

Demographics
The demographic breakdown of the 592 students enrolled for the 2019-2020 year was:
 American Indian/Alaska Native - 0.5%
 Asian - 1.9%
 African American - 7.3%
 Hispanic - 8.7%
 Native Hawaiian/Pacific Islander - 0.4%
 Caucasian - 78.5%
 Two or more races - 2.7%

Athletics
Guntersville High School is a member of the Alabama High School Athletic Association. Their mascot is the Wildcat, and they belong to Region 7 of Class 5A. The school has won a variety of state championship titles, including one for football in 2006.

References

Public high schools in Alabama